Zettel (German: "slip(s) of paper") is a collection of assorted remarks by Ludwig Wittgenstein, first published in 1967. It contains several discussions of philosophical psychology and of the tendency in philosophy to try for a synoptic view of phenomena.  Analyzed subjects include sense, meaning, thinking while speaking, behavior, pretense, imagination, infinity, rule following, imagery, memory, negation, contradiction, calculation, mathematical proof, epistemology, doubt, consciousness, mental states, and sensations. 

Editions include a parallel text English/German edition, edited by Elizabeth Anscombe and Georg Henrik von Wright, first published by Blackwell (UK) and University of California Press (US) in 1967.

References

External links
 

Ludwig Wittgenstein
Books by Ludwig Wittgenstein
Contemporary philosophical literature
Philosophy of psychology